Ashes to Ashes is the third studio album by American deathcore band Chelsea Grin released on July 8, 2014 via Artery and Razor & Tie. It is also the debut of drummer Pablo Viveros. The album also saw the debut of Viveros' co-vocals, allowing lead vocalist Alex Koehler to focus solely on high ranged screams while Viveros took on the mid to low ranged vocals.

Style
AllMusic described the sound of the album as deathcore and on some songs metalcore relating it to that of their previous two studio albums.

Release
 Ashes to Ashes was released on July 8, 2014 by Artery Recordings.

Reception

AllMusic gave the album three and a half stars out of five, noting that "Chelsea Grin marry their punishing breakdowns with some pretty dazzling guitar work, showing that there's more to their sound than just smashing the listener into oblivion."

Track listing

Personnel

Chelsea Grin
 Alex Koehler — lead vocals
 Jason Richardson — lead guitar, programming
 Jake Harmond — rhythm guitar
 Dan Jones — third guitar
 David Flinn — bass
 Pablo Viveros — drums, backing vocals

Production
 Produced by Chelsea Grin, Diego Farias & Stetson Whitworth
 Mixed by Diego Farias, @ Farias Studios
 Mastered by Zack Ohren, @ Castle Ultimate Studios
 Vocal engineered by Stetson Whitworth, @ High Vibe Studios, Salt Lake City, UT
 Guitar & bass engineered by Diego Farias, @ Michael Rogers Guest Bedroom
 Drums engineered by Diego Farias, Stetson Whitworth & Steve Olmon, @ Ameraycan Studios, North Hollywood, CA
 Additional composer: Stephen Rutishauser (4)
 Additional programming by Andres Farias (2, 12)
 Management by Mike Milford & Eric Rushing (The Artery Foundation)
 A&R by Mike Milford
 Booking by Matt Andersen (The Agency Group) & Marco Walzel (Avocado Booking)
 Artwork by Ryan Johnson

Charts

References

2014 albums
Chelsea Grin albums
Artery Recordings albums